Marcel Marin (2 May 1933 – 17 March 1996) was a Romanian footballer who played as a forward and midfielder.

Honours
CCA București
Divizia A: 1956
Petrolul Ploiești
Divizia A: 1958–59
Cupa României: 1962–63

Notes

References

External links
Marcel Marin at Labtof.ro

1933 births
1996 deaths
Romanian footballers
Association football forwards
Liga I players
Liga II players
FC Petrolul Ploiești players
FC Steaua București players
FC UTA Arad players
CS Universitatea Craiova players
CSO Plopeni players
Sportspeople from Ploiești